Gow is an impact crater in Saskatchewan, Canada.

It is 5 km (3 mi) in diameter and the age is estimated to be less than 250 million years (Triassic or later). The crater contains a classic crater lake with an island (Calder Island) formed by the central uplift. It is the smallest known crater in Canada with an uplift structure.

The larger Deep Bay crater, of Cretaceous age, is approximately 90 km east of Gow crater.

References

External links
Aerial Exploration of the Gow impact crater

Impact craters of Saskatchewan
Triassic impact craters
Impact crater lakes
Division No. 18, Saskatchewan